is a Japanese voice actress and singer. She debuted as a singer at the age of 17. Her first voice role was Tenshiko in K.O. Beast in 1992. Some of her major voice roles include Hikaru Shidou in Magic Knight Rayearth, Alpha in Yokohama Kaidashi Kikō, Ami Chono in Girls und Panzer, Tenjōin Katsura in YAT Anshin! Uchu Ryokou, and Celestia in Danganronpa: The Animation. In video games, she provided the voice of Mega Man in Mega Man: The Power Battle and Mega Man 2: The Power Fighters and Pastel in the TwinBee games. Shiina was previously associated with Arts Vision, a major agency for talent in Tokyo, and was working under Sony Music Records, her record label until 2009, when she changed over to Lantis and later Warner Music Japan. She moved from Arts Vision to Voice Kit in February 2021.

Filmography

Anime

Film

Video games

Overseas dubbing

Discography

Studio albums

Compilation albums

Singles

References

External links
  
  at Sony Music 
 
 
 

1974 births
Living people
Anime singers
Japanese video game actresses
Japanese voice actresses
Japanese women pop singers
Singers from Tokyo
Sony Music Entertainment Japan artists
Voice actresses from Tokyo Metropolis
20th-century Japanese actresses
21st-century Japanese actresses
20th-century Japanese women singers
20th-century Japanese singers
21st-century Japanese women singers
21st-century Japanese singers